Kulani Secondary School is a school in the Western Cape of South Africa.

External links
 South Africa Schools

Schools in Cape Town